Radhika Khanna (March 23, 1974 – February 28, 2022) was an Indian-born American fashion designer, entrepreneur and author.
Khanna is the author of Yoga: From the Ganges to Wall Street.

Early life 
Khanna was born and raised in Amritsar, India. She was the daughter of Bindu and Davinder Khanna.

Career 
In 1999 Khanna moved to New York City from Amritsar, to study at Fashion Institute of Technology. While studying full-time, she worked in restaurants in Manhattan to support herself and her education. After graduating from FIT, she interned with Donna Karan, before starting her own clothing company, Estilo Inc. in 2005.

Khanna designed outfits for the U.S
television show Kitchen Nightmares.

Personal life 
Khanna lived in Midtown Manhattan. She was an active participant in the national campaign to find a cure for lupus, through the Lupus foundation of America. She was also a Yoga expert and has promoted Yoga at the Lupus Foundation of America.

Khanna died from multiple organ failure in New York City, on February 28, 2022, at the age of 47. She suffered from lupus, kidney failure, and atypical hemolytic uremic syndrome in the last years of her life.

Bibliography 
 Pose: Yoga for working professionals 
 Yoga: From the Ganges to Wall Street
 Standout: Yoga and self-defense: A complete guide to self-confidence for teenage girls

References

External links 
 

1974 births
2022 deaths
21st-century American women
Indian women fashion designers
Businesspeople from Amritsar
Businesspeople from New York City
Indian emigrants to the United States
American fashion designers
Fashion Institute of Technology alumni
Women yogis
American people of Indian descent
Artists from Amritsar
Artists from New York City
Women artists from Punjab, India
Deaths from multiple organ failure